John Raymond Arthey (24 September 1930 – 27 October 2007) was a British conductor and composer.  He was responsible for arranging many hit pop records in the 1960s and 1970s.

Life and career
Johnny Arthey started his career as a pianist with a military orchestra during his National Service. He became a much sought-after arranger in the 1960s and 1970s, working with Engelbert Humperdinck, Petula Clark, Mary Hopkin, Clodagh Rodgers, Vince Hill, Jonathan King, Julie Rogers, Joe Dassin, Xil Ríos, Camilo Sesto and many more. He wrote the orchestration to hit records such as "Eloise" by Barry Ryan, "Young, Gifted and Black" by Bob and Marcia, and "You Can Get It If You Really Want" by Desmond Dekker.

Through his string arrangements, added to Jamaican recordings, he helped reggae artists such as The Pioneers trying to force a breakthrough on the British market.  He also arranged the Piglets' hit "Johnny Reggae", and led a recording outfit called The Reggae Strings.  In 1972, he formed the studio group Blue Haze with Phillip Swern; their reggae cover version of "Smoke Gets In Your Eyes" reached no. 27 on the U.S. Billboard Hot 100 and no.32 on the UK Singles Chart.

With his Johnny Arthey Orchestra, he released a string of instrumental recordings of popular titles. He conducted orchestras for various BBC broadcasts, and conducted three Eurovision Song Contest entries: two for the UK in 1970 and 1971 and one for Luxembourg in 1977.

Arthey died on 27 October 2007, of a stomach tumour.

References

External links
Johnny Arthey at Discogs.com

1930 births
2007 deaths
English bandleaders
English composers
English conductors (music)
British male conductors (music)
British music arrangers
Eurovision Song Contest conductors
20th-century British male musicians
20th-century British musicians